George Hiddlestone (30 December 1834 – 23 June 1912) was an Australian politician.

Hiddlestone was born in West Tarring in Sussex in 1834. In 1891 he was elected to the Tasmanian House of Assembly, representing the seat of West Hobart. He served until he was defeated contesting Hobart in 1897. He died in 1912 in Hobart.

References

1834 births
1912 deaths
Members of the Tasmanian House of Assembly